According to the Bible, the golden calf (עֵגֶל הַזָּהָב  ‘ēgel hazzāhāv) was an idol (a cult image) made by the Israelites when Moses went up to Mount Sinai. In Hebrew, the incident is known as ḥēṭə’ hā‘ēgel (חֵטְא הָעֵגֶל) or "the sin of the calf". It is first mentioned in the Book of Exodus.

Bull worship was common in many cultures. In Egypt, whence according to the Exodus narrative the Hebrews had recently come, the Apis Bull was a comparable object of worship, which some believe the Hebrews were reviving in the wilderness; alternatively, some believe Yahweh, the national god of the Israelites, was associated with or pictured as a calf/bull deity through the process of religious assimilation and syncretism. Among the Canaanites, some of whom would become the Israelites, the bull was widely worshipped as the Lunar Bull and as the creature of El.

Biblical narrative

When Moses went up into Mount Sinai to receive the Ten Commandments, he left the Israelites for forty days and nights. The Israelites feared that he would not return and demanded that Aaron make them "a god to go before them". Aaron gathered up the Israelites' golden earrings and ornaments, constructed a "molten calf" and they declared: "'This is thy god, O Israel, which brought thee up out of the land of Egypt".

So they rose up early the next day and "offered burnt-offerings, and brought peace-offerings; and the people sat down to eat and to drink, and rose up to play." (Exodus 32:6) God told Moses what the Israelites were up to back in camp, that they had turned aside quickly out of the way which God commanded them and he was going to destroy them and start a new people from Moses. Moses besought and pleaded that they should be spared and "the  repented of the evil which He said He would do unto His people."

Moses went down from the mountain, but upon seeing the calf, he became angry and threw down the two Tablets of Stone, breaking them. Moses burnt the golden calf in a fire, ground it to powder, scattered it on water, and forced the Israelites to drink it. When Moses asked him, Aaron admitted to collecting the gold, and throwing it into the fire, and said it came out as a calf.

Exclusion of the Levites and mass execution

The Bible records that the tribe of Levi did not worship the golden calf. "Moses stood in the gate of the camp, and said: 'Whosoever is on the 's side, let him come unto me.' And all the sons of Levi gathered themselves together unto him. And the sons of Levi did according to the word of Moses; and there fell of the people that day about three thousand men."()

Other mentions in the Bible

The language suggests that there are some inconsistencies in the other accounts of the Israelites and their use of the calf. As the version in Exodus and 1 Kings are written by Deuteronomistic historians based in the southern Kingdom of Judah, there is a proclivity to expose the Israelites as unfaithful. The inconsistency is primarily located in Exodus 32:4 where "gods" is plural despite the construction of a single calf.

The episode of the golden calf is also mentioned in the New Testament, by the apostle Paul, in 1 Corinthians chapter 10, as a warning against idolatry.

Jeroboam's golden calves at Bethel and Dan

His concern was that the tendency to offer sacrifices in Jerusalem, which is in the southern Kingdom of Judah, would lead to a return to King Rehoboam. He makes two golden calves and places them in Bethel and Dan. He erects the two calves in what he figures (in some interpretations) as substitutes for the cherubim built by King Solomon in Jerusalem.

However, in the Antiquities of the Jews (v. VIII: 8), which is taken from the Septuagint, Josephus states: "He made two golden heifers, and built two little temples for them, the one in the city Bethel, and the other in Dan...and he put the heifers into both the little temples in the forementioned cities." This is quite incompatible with any resemblance of the "calves" to the Egyptian Apis Bull, but quite indicative of the Egyptian goddess Hathor, to whom in the Egyptian text "Destruction of Mankind" is attributed cataclysmic events similar to those recounted in Exodus.

Richard Elliott Friedman says "at a minimum we can say that the writer of the golden calf account in Exodus seems to have taken the words that were traditionally ascribed to Jeroboam and placed them in the mouths of the people." Friedman believes that the story was turned into a polemic, exaggerating the throne platform decoration into idolatry, by a family of priests sidelined by Jeroboam.

The declarations of Aaron and Jeroboam are almost identical: 
 'These are your gods, O Israel, who brought you up from the land of Egypt' (Exod 32:4, 8);
 'Behold your gods, O Israel, who brought you up from the land of Egypt (1 Kings 12:28)
After making the golden calf or golden calves both Aaron and Jeroboam celebrate festivals. Aaron builds an altar and Jeroboam ascends an altar (Exod 32:5–6; 1 Kings 12:32–33).

Jewish views

In Legends of the Jews, the Conservative rabbi and scholar Louis Ginzberg wrote that the worship of the golden calf was the disastrous consequence for Israel who took a mixed multitude in their exodus from Egypt. Had not the mixed multitude joined them, Israel would not have been misled to worship this molten idol. The form of the calf itself came from a magical virtue of an ornament leaf with the image of the bull which is made by Aaron.

The devotion of Israel to this worship of the calf was partly explained by a circumstance at passing through the Red Sea, when they beheld the most distinct creature about the Celestial Throne which is the resemblance of ox, then they thought it was an ox who had helped God in their journey from Egypt. After seeing Hur son of Miriam who was carelessly murdered by the people following his rebuke of their ingratitude action to God, Aaron was willing rather to take a sin upon himself to make an idol than to cast the burden of an evil deed upon the people if they commit so terrible sin of killing a priest and prophet among them.

Also there would be among the Israelites no priestly caste, and the nation would have been a nation of priests only if Israel had not sinned through worshiping the golden calf that the greater part of the people lost the right to priesthood, except the tribe of Levi as the only tribe who remained faithful to God and did not partake in this sinful deed.

According to Nachman of Breslov, everyone contributed to the building of the Tabernacle, and the contribution that each Jew made was his or her good points. Thus, the Tabernacle was built by the good points found in each person; this was sufficient to counteract the blemish of the golden calf. The “good points” are reflected in the “gold, silver and copper” that the Jews donated. The various colors of these metals reflect the Supernal Colors and the beauty of a person's good deeds.<ref>Rebbe Nachman of Breslov. Exodus-Leviticus Jerusalem/New York, Breslov Research Institute</ref>

Christian views
Justus Knecht gives two important moral points from the episode of the golden calf: 1) The Mercy of God. "The people of Israel had sinned horribly against God by their idolatry, and yet, at Moses’ intercession, He forgave them." 2) Idolatry. "The weak people were most ungrateful and faithless to God. The Lord had done such great things for them! Only forty days before, full of holy fear, they had heard His voice and had repeatedly promised obedience to His Commandments; and now they transgressed the first and most important of them, and forsook God to worship idols. St Paul calls lust and covetousness idolatry. Whenever a man loves anything more than he loves God, he is guilty of idolatry."

Islamic narrative

The incident of the worship of the golden calf is narrated in the second chapter of the Quran, named Al-Baqarah, and other works of Islamic literature. The Quran narrates that after they refused to enter the promised land, God decreed that as punishment the Israelites would wander for forty years. Moses continued to lead the Israelites to Mount Sinai for divine guidance. According to Islamic literature, God ordered Moses to fast for forty nights before receiving the guidance for the Israelites.(Quran 7:142) When Moses completed the fasts, he approached God for guidance. During this time, Moses had instructed the Israelites that Aaron was to lead them.

The Israelites grew restless, since Moses had not returned to them, and after thirty days, a man the Quran names as Samiri raised doubts among the Israelites. Samiri claimed that Moses had forsaken the Israelites and ordered his followers among the Israelites to light a fire and bring him all the jewelry and gold ornaments they had. Samiri fashioned the gold into a golden calf along with the dust on which the angel Gabriel had trodden, which he proclaimed to be the God of Moses and the God who had guided them out of Egypt. There is a sharp contrast between the Quranic and the biblical accounts of the prophet Aaron's actions. The Quran mentions that Aaron attempted to guide and warn the people from worshipping the golden calf. However, the Israelites refused to stop until Moses had returned. The righteous separated themselves from the pagans. God informed Moses that he had tried the Israelites in his absence and that they had failed by worshipping the golden calf.

Returning to the Israelites in great anger, Moses asked Aaron why he had not stopped the Israelites when he had seen them worshipping the golden calf. The Quran reports that Aaron stated that he did not act due to the fear that Moses would blame him for causing divisions among the Israelites. Moses realized his helplessness in the situation, and both prayed to God for forgiveness. According to Qur’anic sources Moses then questioned Samiri for the creation of the golden calf; Samiri justified his actions by stating that he had thrown the dust of the ground upon which Gabriel had tread on into the fire because his soul had suggested it to him. Moses informed him that he would be banished and that they would burn the golden calf and spread its dust into the sea. Moses ordered seventy delegates to repent to God and pray for forgiveness. The delegates traveled alongside Moses to Mount Sinai, where they witnessed the speech between him and God but refused to believe until they had witnessed God with their sight. As punishment, God struck the delegates with lightning and killed them with a violent earthquake. Moses prayed to God for their forgiveness. God forgave and resurrected them and they continued on their journey.

In the Islamic view, the calf-worshipers' sin had been shirk, the sin of idolatry or polytheism. Shirk is the deification or worship of anyone or anything other than Allah, or more literally the establishment of "partners" placed beside God, a most serious sin.

Criticism and interpretation
According to modern scholarship, there are two versions of the Ten Commandments story, in Elohist (Exodus 20) and Jahwist (Exodus 34), this gives some antiquity and there may be some original events serving as a basis to the stories. The Golden Calf story is only in the E version and a later editor added in an explanation that God made a second pair of tablets to give continuity to the J story. The actual Ten Commandments as given in Exodus 20 were also inserted by the redactor who combined the various sources.

Current historiography considers that this episode was introduced into the Exodus account in the time of Josiah (622) or later to discredit the custom rooted in the Kingdom of Israel (North) of identifying Yahweh with a bull. The cult of the bull was rooted in Palestine from pre-Israelite times, as attested by the archaeological find of a bronze bull in the sanctuary of the acropolis of Jasor dated to the late Bronze Age. A bronze bull has also been found in an Israelite sanctuary east of Tel Dothan, in the mountains of Samaria, dated to around the 11th century.

Albertz says that when we read in 1Kings 12:28 that the first monarch of the northern kingdom, Jeroboam, had introduced the worship of golden calves in Bethel and Dan, we must interpret that what Jeroboam really does is to return to the traditional Israelite religion, as opposed to the syncretistic innovations introduced by David and Solomon in centralizing the cult in Jerusalem.

According to Michael Coogan, it seems that the golden calf was not an idol for another god, and thus a false god. He cites  as evidence:
 Importantly, there is a single calf in this narrative. While the people refer to it as representative of the "gods", this is a possessive form of the word Elohim ( elo'hecha, from ), which is a name of God as well as general word for "gods". While a reference to singular god does not necessarily imply Yahweh worship, the word usually translated as 'lord' is Yahweh  in the original, so at least it can't be ruled out. In the chronology of Exodus the commandment against the creation of graven images had not yet been given to the people when they pressed upon Aaron to help them make the calf, and that such behavior was not yet explicitly outlawed.

Another understanding of the golden calf narrative is that the calf was meant to be the pedestal of Yahweh. In Near Eastern art, gods were often depicted standing on an animal, rather than seated on a throne. This reading suggests that the golden calf was merely an alternative to the ark of the covenant or the cherubim upon which Yahweh was enthroned.

The reason for this complication may be understood as
 a criticism of Aaron, as the founder of one priestly house that rivaled the priestly house of Moses, and/or
 as "an attack on the northern kingdom of Israel." The second explanation relies on the "sin of Jeroboam," who was the first king of the northern kingdom, as the cause of the northern kingdom's fall to Assyria in 722 BCE. Jeroboam's "sin" was creating two calves of gold, and sending one to Bethel as a worship site in the south of the Kingdom, and the other to Dan as a worship site in the north, so that the people of the northern kingdom would not have to continue to go to Jerusalem to worship (see 1 Kings 12:26–30). According to Coogan, this episode is part of the Deuteronomistic history, written in the southern Kingdom of Judah, after the fall of the northern kingdom, which was biased against the northern kingdom. Coogan maintains that Jeroboam was merely presenting an alternative to the cherubim of the Temple in Jerusalem, and that calves did not indicate non-Yahwehistic worship.

The documentary hypothesis can be used to further understand the layers of this narrative: it is plausible that the earliest story of the golden calf was preserved by E (Israel source) and originated in the Northern kingdom. When E and J (Judah source) were combined after the fall of northern kingdom, "the narrative was reworked to portray the northern kingdom in a negative light," and the worship of the calf was depicted as "polytheism, with the suggestion of a sexual orgy" (see Exodus 32:6). When compiling the narratives, P (a later Priest source from Jerusalem) may have minimized Aaron's guilt in the matter, but preserved the negativity associated with the calf.

Alternatively it could be said that there is no golden calf story in the J source, and if it is correct that the Jeroboam story was the original as stated by Friedman, then it is unlikely that the golden calf events as described in Exodus occurred at all. Friedman states that the smashing of the Ten Commandments by Moses when he beheld the worship of the golden calf, is really an attempt to cast into doubt the validity of Judah's central shrine, the Ark of the Covenant. "The author of E, in fashioning the golden calf story, attacked both the Israelite and Judean religious establishments."

As adoration of wealth
A metaphoric interpretation emphasizes the "gold" part of "golden calf" to criticize the pursuit of wealth. This usage can be found in Spanish where Mammon, the Gospel personification of idolatry of wealth, is not so current.

In popular culture
Eponymous subjectsLe veau d'or est toujours debout (The Golden Calf is still standing), an aria in Charles Gounod's opera FaustCave of the Golden Calf, a notorious nightclub in Edwardian London, created by Frida Uhl 
"The Golden Calf and the Altar", an episode in the unfinished opera Moses und Aron, a three-act, uncompleted opera by Arnold SchoenbergThe Golden Calf, a sculpture by conceptual artist Damien Hirst
"The Golden Calf", a song on the Prefab Sprout album From Langley Park to MemphisMooby the Golden Calf, a fictional character featured in the works of Kevin SmithThe Little Golden Calf, a satirical novel by Soviet authors Ilf and Petrov Dance Around the Golden Calf, a painting by Emil Nolde The Calf of Dan'', a sculpture by James W. Washington Jr.
The 2021 Conservative Political Action Conference (CPAC) featured a golden statue of former United States President Donald Trump. Online commentators compared the figure with the Exodus's golden calf, considering Trump's largely evangelical and conservative Christian base.

Others

 In Episode 79 of Batman, a Golden Calf full of money was stolen by The Riddler

See also
 Bull of Heaven
 Cattle in religion
 Erev Rav
 Gugalanna
 Ki Tissa and Eikev, Torah parshiot dealing with the Golden Calf 
 Red heifer
 Sacred bull
 Tauroctony

References

Further reading

External links

 The Golden calf from a Jewish perspective at Chabad.org
 Rabbi Fohrman's Lectures on the Golden Calf
 The Golden calf from Ein Hod perspective
 Islamic interpretation of the story of the Golden calf in the Qur'an
 Story of Muses and Aaron in the Qur'an
 Jewish Encyclopedia: Calf, Golden
 Online Quran Project 20.83

 
Aaron
Animal sculptures
Animals in the Bible
Book of Exodus
Cattle in art
Cattle in religion
Cult images
Deities in the Hebrew Bible
Gold sculptures
Hebrew Bible words and phrases
Hebrew Bible objects
Idolatry
Jewish art
Metaphors referring to cattle
Moses
Mythological bovines
Horned deities
Sacred bulls
Cattle deities